Haukur Halldórsson (born 1937 in Reykjavík) is an Icelandic artist and illustrator. After beginning his career as a graphic designer and illustrator he developed into a visual artist.  Halldórsson's work also includes sculpture.  He is a co-author of the Yggdrasil Divination Deck together with his daughter Gunnhildur Hauksdóttir.

Biography & Personal Life 
Haukur Halldórsson was born in Reykjavík in 1937. He married Sigrún Kristjánsdóttir and has three children with her: a son Kristján Már Hauksson, who works in digital advertising, daughter Hallgerður Haukssdóttir, chairwoman of the Icelandic Animal Association, and contemporary artist Gunnhildur Hauksdóttir who has worked with Halldórsson on several projects. He is active in the Icelandic neopagan organisation Ásatrúarfélagið. In 1994, he stood for election to become the organization's allsherjargoði, but lost to Jörmundur Ingi Hansen. Aside from his artistic work Halldórsson has been a commercial designer, a sailor and builder for over the years.

Education and early career 
He studied at the Icelandic College of Art and Crafts but never graduated. He moved to Copenhagen to continue his studies in design and print and returned to Iceland in the early 1960s, There, he started the advertising agency Cello with his friend from studying in Denmark, Egil Nordheim. He subsequently started Kassgerðin Design Agency in partnership with Bragi Hinriksson. After Kassagerðin, he worked independently in advertising until the early 1980s when he started focusing solely on becoming an artist.

During his years as a designer, he worked on multiple projects, ranging from stamps to different packaging designs. While at Kassagerðin he created the promotional material for H-dagurinn in 1968 when Iceland moved from left traffic to right.

As an Artist 
His first art exhibition was in Gallery Djúpið in Reykjavík in 1978 with Einar Þorsteinn Ásgeirsson. His first solo exhibition was in Reykjavík in 1980 in Gallery Torg run by the composer Jóhann G. Jóhannson. Since then he has made numerous exhibitions in Europe, China and the United States. Allthough his main medium is drawing and illustrations, he works in, and explores various mediums such as painting, sculpture, and jewel making.

Halldorsson's main subject matter revolves around themes of folklore of his home country Iceland, the Brothers Grimm, Celtic mythology and Nordic mythology. He has created numerous drawings and illustrations on the subjects. Halldórsson has travelled widely to research art, to China, various countries in Europe, and the United States. In New Mexico he encountered Navajo Indians, and observed the art of sand-casting, which he later applied in his own art practice.

His selection of works from 1978 to date combines disparate elements from the worlds of fantasy, myth and everyday experience. His artwork often contains mythical and magical entities as much of his practice revolves around North-European mythology and Nordic mythology. He has gathered information about historical pagan European calendars and myths associated with different parts of the year, which has been the basis for some of his works.

One of his most famous works is the Arctic Henge (Heimskautsgerðið), a series of circles and basalt columns that began its construction in 2004 at the village Raufarhöfn in northeastern Iceland. It has a diameter of 52 meters, functioning as a pagan calendar with numerous references to Norse mythology particularly the Dvergatal of the Poetic Edda.

Yggdrasil Divination Deck 
Among his latest work are his illustrations for the Yggdrasil Divination Deck. that he worked on with his daughter Gunnhildur Hauksdóttir and which draws from Norse mythology.  It was published in 2019 by Llewellyn Worldwide.

Board Games 
From early age, he had a keen interest in board games and has through the years designed and published several of them, He designed the board game Útvegsspilið and co-published it together with Tómas Tómasson and Jón Jónsson. In the game, players compete by earning money in the fishing industry. The game became a big success in Iceland and paved the way for Rallyspilið, Dýraspilið and Astróspilið which he designed with Einar Þorsteinn Ásgeirsson. He created custom chess pieces based on the Tupilaq, native myths from Greenland

Illustrated Works 
Steinn Bollason: ævintýri frá Rúmeníu, by Hólmfríður Knudsen (1967)
Íslenzk frímerki í 100 ár(1977)
Útvegsspilið (1977)
Á förnum vegi: umferðarleiðbeiningar handa 7–9 ára börnum, by Sigurður Pálsson (1979)
Stóra barnabókin: sögur, ævintýri, ljóð, þulur, bænir, barnagælur, gátur, leikir, þrautir, föndur, by Jóhanna Thorsteinsson (1982)
Tröll: sögur og teikningar úr íslenskri þjóđsagnaveröld, by Jón Árnason (1982)
, by Anders Hansen (1983)
Blautleg ljóð, by Skeið sf (1985)
Í stjörnumyrkri, by Ari Gísli Bragason (1989)
Reiðskólinn þinn: undirstöðuatriði reiðmennsku í máli og myndum, by Haukur Halldórsson (1991)
Álfar, æsir og menn : fyrsti hluti, by Haukur Halldórsson (2008)
Galdur og ættarmerki, by Haukur Halldórsson (2008)
Tarot norðursins, by Haukur Halldórsson (2009)
"Fóa og Fóa feykirófa: þjóðsaga", by Haukur Halldórsson, Nesti og nýir skór (2015)

English translations 
Some Icelandic recipes, by Elín Kristjánsdóttir (1973)
One Hundred Years of Icelandic Stamps, (1977)
Trolls in Icelandic folklore: stories and drawings, by Jón Árnason (1982)
Elves, aesir and humans: first book, by Haukur Halldórsson (2008)
Yggdrasil: Norse Divination Deck, by Haukur Halldórsson and Gunnhildur Hauksdóttir Publisher:Llewellyn Worldwide (2019)

References

External links 
 Official Website

1937 births
Haukur Halldorsson
Haukur Halldorsson
Haukur Halldorsson
Living people
Haukur Halldorsson
Modern pagan artists
Haukur Halldorsson
Board game designers
Adherents of Germanic neopaganism